Matsuricon is a three-day anime convention held during August in Columbus, Ohio, at the Hyatt Regency Columbus and Greater Columbus Convention Center. The convention is family friendly.

Programming
The convention typically offers an artist alley, cosplay contest, dealers room, formal ball, gaming (arcade, board, video), karaoke, masquerade, and a video contest. The Carolina Manga Library provided the conventions manga library in 2014. Matsuricon's 2014 charity fundraisers raised $13,916 and benefited Pelotonia.

History
In 2012 the convention hosted the Distant Worlds concert, led by Arnie Roth. The concert was followed up with a meet and greet event with composer Nobuo Uematsu for VIP ticket holders. Matsuricon in 2018 shared convention center space with an Ohio GOP dinner that featured as a speaker President Donald Trump. Matsuricon 2020 and 2021 was cancelled and replaced by virtual events due to the COVID-19 pandemic.

Event history

References

External links
 

Anime conventions in the United States
Recurring events established in 2006
2006 establishments in Ohio
Annual events in Ohio
Festivals in Ohio
Culture of Columbus, Ohio
Tourist attractions in Columbus, Ohio
Conventions in Ohio